Roger Etienne Brunschwig (July 14, 1891 — Dec 7, 1972) Commander of the Legion of Honor, was a much‐decorated French hero of the two world wars.

WWI and after
After World War I, he (co) founded the Union des Blesses de la Face et de la tête (association of the wounded to the face and the head). Brunschwig was also a "discreet treasurer and financier" of the association. He served as its president 1970-1972.

WWII
Brunschwig was one of the first to answer the call to arms by de Gaulle in June, 1940.

He was one of the founders of France Forever in that year.

In June, 1944, as colonel of the Free French Forces, he led the Free French Military Liaison Mission to the United States Forces.  Brunschwig headed 200 French liaison officers who landed in Operation Overlord, joining the battle for the liberation of Europe.

Personal & business 
Roger Brunschwig joined his father, Achille who founded Brunschwig & Fils Inc. Around 1925, he brought the company to the US, soon, the company had opened showrooms in New York and other American cities. In 1929, he married Zelina Brunschwig. She joined his textile firm in 1941 as a stylist.
After World War II, Brunschwig and his interior designer wife, Zelina, expanded
Brunschwig & Fils to include wallpapers and trimmings.

Brunschwig died on Dec 7, 1972 in NY.

See also
Gueules cassées

References

1891 births
1972 deaths
Recipients of the Legion of Honour
American people of French descent